Tresivio is a comune (municipality) in the Province of Sondrio in the Italian region Lombardy, located about  northeast of Milan and about  east of Sondrio.

The municipality of Tresivio contains the frazioni (subdivisions, mainly villages and hamlets) Acqua and Centro.

Tresivio borders the following municipalities: Montagna in Valtellina, Piateda, Poggiridenti, Ponte in Valtellina.

Tresivio hosts a Roman Catholic sanctuary dedicated to the Black Madonna whose relic is kept into the Temple. The sanctuary was built in the 17th century on the model of the Basilica della Santa Casa in Loreto.

Demographic evolution

References

External links
 www.comune.tresivio.so.it

Cities and towns in Lombardy